Television New Zealand, more commonly referred to as TVNZ, is a television network that is broadcast throughout New Zealand and parts of the Pacific region. All of its currently-operating channels are free-to-air and commercially funded.

TVNZ was established in February 1980 following the merger of the two government-owned television networks, Television One (now TVNZ 1) and South Pacific Television (now TVNZ 2), under a single administration. It was the sole television broadcaster in New Zealand until November 1989 when private channel TV3 (now Three) was launched.

TVNZ operates playout services from its Auckland studio via Kordia's fibre and microwave network for TVNZ 1, TVNZ 2 and TVNZ Duke, with new media video services via the American-owned Brightcove which is streamed on the Akamai RTMP/HLS DNS based caching network. Its former channels include TVNZ Kidzone (closed 30 April 2016), TVNZ Heartland (closed 31 May 2015), TVNZ U (closed August 2013), TVNZ 7 (closed June 2012), TVNZ 6 (closed 2011), and TVNZ Sport Extra (closed 2009).

Approximately 90% of TVNZ's revenue is from commercial activity (such as advertising and merchandising). The remainder of its funding comes from government funding agencies. There has been reoccurring debate about TVNZ's role and whether it should be treated as a public-service broadcaster or a fully commercial network.

History

{| class="wikitable" style="text-align:center;"
! Ownership
!  
!1
!2
!6
!7
!11
!12
!13
!14
!18
!20
!Sky 17
!Sky 46
|-
!rowspan=3|Separate
!1960
|NZBC TV
|
| rowspan="6" 
| rowspan="7" 
| rowspan="19" 
| rowspan="19" 
| rowspan="13" 
| rowspan="16" 
| rowspan="18" 
| rowspan="6" 
| rowspan="8" 
| rowspan="9" 
|-
!1975
| rowspan="14" |TV One
|TV2
|-
!1976
|South Pacific Television
|-
!rowspan=50|TVNZ
!1980
|TV2
|-
!1989
|Channel 2
|-
!1995
| rowspan="10" |TV2
|-
!2007
| rowspan="3" |TVNZ 6
| rowspan="2" |TVNZ Sport Extra
|-
!2008
| rowspan="3" |TVNZ 7
|-
!2010
| rowspan="50" 
| rowspan="5" |TVNZ Heartland
|-
!2011
| rowspan="2" |U
| rowspan="5" |TVNZ Kidzone24
|-
!2012
|TV One Plus 1
|-
!2013
| rowspan="4" |TV One Plus 1
| rowspan="4" |TV2+1
|-
!2014
|-
!2015
|TVNZ Pop-up
| rowspan="50" 
|-
! rowspan="2" |2016
| Duke
| rowspan="50" 
|- 
| rowspan=5 | TVNZ 1
|rowspan="5" |TVNZ 2
|rowspan="4" |TVNZ 1+1
|rowspan="5" |TVNZ 2+1
|rowspan="4" |TVNZ Duke
|-
! rowspan=2 |2018
|TVNZ Games Extra
|-
|rowspan="3" 
|-
! 2020
|TVNZ Duke+1
|-
! 2022
|TVNZ Duke
|TVNZ 1+1
|rowspan=2 | TVNZ Duke+1
| 
| 
|}

Formation
TVNZ was created in February 1980, through the merger of Television One and South Pacific Television (which was renamed TV2). Until January 1989, it was paired with Radio New Zealand as the Broadcasting Corporation of New Zealand (BCNZ).

The broadcaster was initially based in Television One's former headquarters at the Avalon television centre in Lower Hutt, with TV One broadcasting out of Avalon and TV2 broadcasting out of Auckland. However over the course of the 1980s, operations were gradually moved to Auckland. In 1989, TVNZ moved to a new television centre in central Auckland.

Broadcasting in New Zealand was deregulated in 1989. Private broadcasters were allowed to operate in competition to TVNZ. The Broadcasting Act 1989 also established the organisation now called NZ on Air which funds public broadcasting and independent media production in New Zealand.

Role as public broadcaster

The Labour-led government under Helen Clark from 1999 to 2008 pursued a programme of public broadcasting reforms. New Zealand's wide-ranging adoption of neoliberal policies in the mid-1980s and 1990s had large sections of the state sector privatised. As a state owned enterprise, TVNZ enjoyed enormous commercial success (sustaining two-thirds of the overall audience share) and paid the Crown substantial dividends (over $250 million between 1989 and 1999). However, the commercial success had been achieved through an unabashed pursuit of ratings through populist and tabloid content, and prior to the 1999 election the National-led government was evidently positioning TVNZ for commercialisation Labour-led administrations since 1999 explicitly recognised the market failures of a wholly commercial broadcasting sector (e.g. saturation-level advertising, low levels of local content, heavy reliance on cheap imports and a disregard for quality genres and in-depth news and current affairs) and re-emphasised television's cultural and democratic functions in their policy thinking.

The Clark government's highest profile broadcasting reform to date was the restructuring of TVNZ as a Crown entity in 2003. This introduced a dual remit whereby the broadcaster had to maintain its commercial performance (continuing dividend payments to the Crown) while simultaneously implementing a new public service Charter.

The TVNZ Charter would require the negotiation and reconciliation of potentially contradictory commercial and public service imperatives. The final version of the TVNZ Charter included a range of public service objectives and expectations.

However, this dual remit precluded any transformation of TVNZ into fully-fledged public service broadcaster, and TVNZ's efforts to balance its pursuit of commercial performance and Charter objectives were soon being criticised. Despite some investment in local content, including new documentaries and discussion programmes, the content on TV One and TV2 remained similar to the pre-charter schedules, with a continuing high proportion of light entertainment and reality-TV shows.

TVNZ continues to pay dividends to the Crown. However, from 2006 until 2009 TVNZ received $15.11 million each year from Government to assist it with fulfilling Charter obligations. There was much debate about the initial secrecy surrounding funding allocations and the programmes supported. The allocation of $5 million toward coverage of the 2008 Olympics, the rights for which are secured by a competitive tender between broadcasters, was possibly the most controversial. In 2009 the Government gave control of that funding to funding agency NZ On Air. NZ On Air announced the creation of the contestable "Platinum Fund" in April 2009, setting aside the $15.11 million for high quality drama, documentary and other programme types. Following the election of a National Party-led government under John Key in 2008, the Charter was abolished in favour of a return to the 1990s model of a full commercial broadcaster.

There is much debate on the future of TVNZ, which focuses on the nature of public service broadcasting and its commercial role. An example was in a memo called A More Public Broadcaster written by outgoing Chief Executive Ian Fraser to the board of TVNZ in October 2005, was obtained and released by Green MP Sue Kedgley. The memo outlined three (four) options.

These were:
 TV One as a fully non-commercial network, like ABC in Australia, charged with delivering Charter values, and possibly merging with Radio New Zealand and Māori Television
 TV One a semi-commercial broadcaster with no more than six minutes of advertisements an hour like SBS in Australia
 TV One and TV2 remaining unchanged, but two new public service channels being broadcast via digital television.
 TV One and TV2 are now fully commercial with 15 – 20 minutes of ads per hour, plus ads overplayed over programs.

On 15 February 2006, a group of 31 prominent New Zealanders signed an open letter, published as a full-page newspaper advertisement, calling for better quality programmes and less advertising on TVNZ. These included mountaineer Sir Edmund Hillary, and former governors-general Sir Michael Hardie Boys and Dame Catherine Tizard. However, they were accused of being out of touch and nostalgic for local programmes from the 1970s and 1980s, when New Zealand had only one or two TV channels. While the Broadcasting Minister, Steve Maharey, ruled out turning TVNZ into an entirely non-commercial broadcaster, on 25 February 2006, he stated that the Labour Government was "pretty much settled" on the introduction of two new free-to-air, non-commercial channels available via digital television. One screening high-end international documentaries, re-runs of One News and minority programmes with a high local content, and another, primarily for children, screening serious drama and arts at night. These channels would eventually become known as TVNZ 7 and TVNZ 6 respectively.

Digital era
In early 2006, TVNZ purchased Harmonic branded H.262 encoding equipment for the upcoming Freeview DTH service, which is an Electra 1000 on-the-fly video re-encoder.

On 14 November 2006, TVNZ announced plans to launch two commercial-free digital channels. The first, with the working title TVNZ News 24, would feature news, sport and special interest content, and be launched in late 2007. This would be followed by a channel featuring children's, families', arts and documentary programming, with the working title of TVNZ Home, in early 2008. While 80 per cent of the programming would be local content, 70 per cent of this would consist of repeats from TVNZ's existing channels or its archive.

In April 2008, TVNZ made another purchase of more H.264 encoding equipment for the upcoming Freeview HD DTT service, which are the Electra 7000 for HD and Electra 5400 for SD on-the-fly video re-encoders.

The proposal was criticised by TV3, which accused the Government of "bailing out" TVNZ and argued that the money would be better spent on new programming. Although Sue Kedgely welcomed the decision to make the channels (including children's programming) commercial-free, she accused the Government of tight-fistedness.

In late 2011, TVNZ and its pay-TV rival Sky Network Television announced the joint venture Igloo, which is to provide a low-cost pay-TV service for households not currently covered by Freeview or Sky. Igloo closed in 2017.

In mid 2013, TVNZ changed its on-screen branding to a more flat, modern look. TVNZ went fully digital in December 2013, with the accompanying shutdown of the analogue transmitters to free up spectrum for telecommunications use.

In January 2017 TVNZ launched their 'New Blood Web Series Competition' supported by NZ On Air. The competition is calling for aspiring content creators to submit a web series pilot episode. The winner will receive $100,000 to make a complete web series, which will launch through TVNZ's online channels.

Conflicts
In addition to debates over whether TVNZ should be a public broadcaster or a commercial one, there have been other controversies.

For 3 weeks in January–February 1999, John Hawkesby became a weekday newsreader for One News, replacing Richard Long (who moved to presenting weekend bulletins alongside Liz Gunn). The change was short-lived, and Hawkesby received a $5.2m payout.

In 2000, the Broadcasting Standards Authority ruled against TVNZ over inaccuracies in a news story about the drug Lyprinol, which was erroneously touted as a cure for cancer.

In 2004 current affairs veteran of 15 years Paul Holmes sparked a public outcry after he referred to United Nations Secretary-General Kofi Annan as a "cheeky darkie" on his radio show on Newstalk ZB and subsequently chose not to renew his contract at TVNZ.

Also in 2004 there was the public outcry over newsreader Judy Bailey's $800,000 salary package, negotiated with head of news and current affairs at TVNZ Bill Ralston, she finished her final 12-month contract the following year after 34 years working at the broadcaster.

In late 2010, TVNZ garnered criticism over various comments made by Breakfast host Paul Henry. Henry had referred to Delhi Commonwealth Games organiser Sheila Dikshit as "the dip shit woman" and "Dick Shit", going on to state that "it's so appropriate, because she's Indian, so she'd be dick-in-shit wouldn't she, do you know what I mean? Walking along the street... she's just so funny, isn't she?" Henry also questioned whether the Governor-General of New Zealand Anand Satyanand was "even a New Zealander", going on to ask, "Are you going to choose a New Zealander who looks and sounds like a New Zealander this time ... are we going to go for someone who is more like a New Zealander this time?" Following widespread public complaints and official criticism, Henry was suspended from TVNZ for 2 weeks without pay, eventually resigning from the broadcaster. Henry's resignation polarised the New Zealand public, with supporters claiming he was a victim of political correctness, and critics accusing him of pandering to the lowest common denominator.

Proposed merger
Renewing previous debate about the role of TVNZ as a commercial broadcaster, the Sixth Labour Government has announced a proposal to disestablish TVNZ and Radio New Zealand (RNZ) and establish a single public media entity. The television and radio broadcaster would have a public-service role to provide content on a variety of platforms, "some of which may be advertising free". By mid-March 2021, the merger proposal was still in its early stages.

In late December 2021, former National Party Member of Parliament Simon Power was appointed as the chief executive of TVNZ. Power had recently stepped down as acting chief of Westpac Bank when the bank appointed Catherine McGrath as chief executive in November 2021. Power is scheduled to assume the position in March 2022.

In mid-June 2022, Broadcasting Minister Willie Jackson introduced draft legislation to TVNZ and fellow public broadcaster Radio New Zealand into a new non-profit autonomous Crown entity called Aotearoa New Zealand Public Media (ANZPM), commencing 1 March 2023. Under the proposed legislation, both TVNZ and RNZ would become subsidiaries of the ANZPM, which would be supported by both government and commercial funding. The new organisation would also be headed by a board and be governed by a media charter outlining its goals and responsibilities including editorial independence. The Government has also allocated NZ$370m over four years in operating expenditure and $306m in capital funding from the 2022 New Zealand budget for funding the ANZPM.

On 8 February 2023, Prime Minister Chris Hipkins announced that the merger of TVNZ and RNZ into ANZPM would be scrapped due to a shift in government priorities towards "cost of living issues." He confirmed that both TVNZ and RNZ would receive additional government funding. Prior to the public media entity's cancellation, the two public broadcasters had spent a total of  NZ$1,023,701 on ANZPM; with TVNZ spending NZ$592,424 in the period between 1 March and 31 October 2022.

Governance

Board of directors
The TVNZ Board is the governing board of Television New Zealand. It is appointed by the Minister of Broadcasting, Communications and Digital Media, who is  Kris Faafoi. , the directors are: the chairperson Dame Therese Walsh (Wellington), deputy chairperson Andy Coupe (Hamilton), Abby Foote (Christchurch), Cameron Harland (Lower Hutt), Toko Kapea (Wellington), Kevin Malloy (Auckland), Julia Raue (Auckland) and Susan Turner (Auckland). Former board members include Roger MacDonnell (2010-2016).

Charter

The Fifth Labour Government introduced a "TVNZ Charter" in 2002. This was a list of objectives for TVNZ which specified it must broadcast a wide variety of New Zealand-made content; the broadcaster was given public responsibility to provide news, drama, documentaries and "promote understanding of the diversity of cultures". In 2008 the Government announced that the broadcaster was to become "more public-service" like. TVNZ responded by launching two commercial free channels; TVNZ 6 and TVNZ 7. By 2011 Prime Minister John Key announced the closure of these channels. 6 in 2011, and 7 in mid-2012, with much of their content put into TVNZ Heartland and TVNZ Kidzone24 which are only available behind a Sky TV paywall. The Fifth National Government abolished the Charter in 2011. Political opponents accused the Government of reducing TVNZ's commitments as a public broadcaster.

Channels

TVNZ 1 
 
TVNZ 1 is TVNZ's flagship channel. Launched on 1 June 1960, it has a broad range of programming, including news, sport, food, drama, and comedy. Its news service is 1 News and its sports division is 1 Sport.

The channel, once the traditional home of television sport, has since lost the rights to most of the world's main sporting events, including the Olympics, and All Blacks test matches to pay television competitor Sky. TVNZ's outside broadcasting division, Moving Pictures was established in 1962. It provided the production facilities for such events with 8 outside broadcast trucks across the country. This wound up in the mid 2000s after then-Australian owned outside broadcaster Onsite Broadcasting started to expand and took the OB contract off Moving Pictures for the filming of major sports for Sky TV. OSB was then owned by Sky before it was sold to American OB provider NEP. TVNZ 1 also broadcasts rural focused programmes such as Country Calendar and Rural Delivery, Māori community presentations such as Waka Huia, Marae Investigates and Te Karere, a daily Te Reo news bulletin, and shows for minorities, such as Attitude, Neighbourhood, A Taste of Home and Tagata Pasifika. Elsewhere TVNZ 1 specialises in food shows, including the locally produced MasterChef, and international shows, mostly from the BBC and Network Ten Australia.

TVNZ 2 

TVNZ 2 targets a younger audience than TVNZ 1. Launched on 30 June 1975, its line up consists of dramas, sitcoms, comedies, children's programming, and reality shows, most of which are produced in New Zealand or imported from the United States.

Locally produced content includes Shortland Street, Motorway Patrol and What Now, and international shows (which are predominantly American) include The Big Bang Theory, The Simpsons and The Walking Dead. TVNZ 2 is sold by TVNZ as the "home of entertainment".

TVNZ Duke
 
TVNZ Duke was launched on 20 March 2016. It initially broadcast between the hours of 6pm and midnight, although it occasionally screened live sport events outside of these hours. On average, the channel broadcasts from 10.30am until late on weekdays, and from 7am until late on weekends. It screens programming for a male audience with comedy, drama and factual series such as Two and a Half Men, Family Guy, The Simpsons, Everybody Hates Chris and River Monsters. It also screens a number of sporting events such as the Men's and Women's Hockey Pro Leagues and the Dream11 Super Smash domestic cricket tournament.

Timeshift channels
TVNZ broadcasts timeshift channels of its three television channels. These broadcast the Auckland feed, delayed by one hour. TVNZ 1+1 was launched on 1 July 2012, replacing TVNZ 7. TVNZ 2+1 was launched on 1 September 2013, replacing TVNZ U. TVNZ Duke+1 was launched on 17 November 2020.

Other services
Internationally, TVNZ has helped provide television services in Pacific Island nations such as the Cook Islands, Fiji, and the Solomon Islands. While TVNZ provides much of the programming, scheduling and continuity are done locally.

Because of its history TVNZ has inherited and developed its own services in the production and broadcasting services area. These include The New Zealand Television Archive, production facilities, television school.

TVNZ Archive

The TVNZ Archive collection contains over 600,000 hours of television spanning almost 55 years of New Zealand's public television history. It includes iconic New Zealand content such as documentaries, dramas, sports programmes and every TVNZ news broadcast from December 1986 to 2014. In a 2014 briefing to Minister Craig Foss, the Ministry for Culture and Heritage noted that the long-term preservation of the TVNZ Archive collection did not align with broadcaster's business needs and that transferring the collection to the Crown would allow for the proper preservation of the collection. Both the Ministry and TVNZ explicitly wanted to ensure the archive was preserved and that it was made increasingly available for re-use through online streaming and other means. On 1 August 2014 guardianship of the archive collection was transferred to the Crown. Budget 2014 included $24.4 million to facilitate the transfer and ongoing management of the archive.  Of that, $11.32 million was for the purchase of the TVNZ Archive facility at Avalon – including land, building, fixtures, fittings and plant. $5.066 million was for the depreciation and capital charge of the facility, and $8 million (spread over four years) was for the ongoing management of the archive. The building and land were transferred to the Department of Internal Affairs and the Ministry for Culture and Heritage took over guardianship of the collection. The Ministry appointed Ngā Taonga Sound & Vision as the initial archive manager.

TVNZ+

TVNZ+ is Television New Zealand's on-demand streaming platform, TVNZ OnDemand was launched 20 March 2007, and is available on PlayStation 3 and PlayStation 4 via the TVNZ app on PlayStation Network for New Zealanders. It is also available on FreeviewPlus, iOS, Android, Xbox One and Windows 10. The content uses geotargeting for New Zealand only connections via a US-based Brightcove media company using the Akamai RTMP network, with some local content being made available to an international audience via their YouTube channel. At the end of 2012, the contract with Brightcove was expanded to include streaming to iOS devices via the Akamai HLS network. From 2012, TVNZ OnDemand began uploading episodes of select shows prior to their airing on TVNZ channels and usually within a day of their original overseas airings (although sometimes this was weeks or months after their international airing). In September 2014, it was announced that episodes of seventeen shows would be uploaded within a day of their airings in the US, coinciding with the 2014–2015 season. One of the shows, Manhattan Love Story was cancelled by the US network ABC, but episodes continued to be uploaded to TVNZ OnDemand in line with their intended US airings, making TVNZ the de facto original broadcaster of the series. On 1 May 2016 (01.06 am), when TVNZ Kidzone (channel version) closed it is now on TVNZ OnDemand with lot of the shows to watch (it is still use the former channel programs). On June 13th the service rebranded to TVNZ+ after on Friday 10 TVNZ sent an email out to staff saying "exciting upgrade coming for TVNZ OnDemand."

Teletext 

TVNZ began a teletext service in 1984 originally with the intention to help New Zealand's deaf community get improved access to news and information. A captioning service was available for certain television shows and could be accessed by browsing to page 801. The TVNZ Teletext service could be received on all TVNZ channels and the TVNZ service could be received on TV3 including captioning of some TV3 shows. Trackside also operated a Teletext service called TAB Text which only displayed the racing pages of Teletext.

A Teletext capable television was usually required to receive Teletext. With the arrival of digital television services such as Freeview, Teletext could be received through a Freeview decoder. In this case captions were normally accessed by subtitle button on a Freeview remote.

In December 2012, TVNZ announced the closure of their Teletext service from 3 April 2013. The captioning service would however continue to be available. TVNZ cited the reasons for the closure due to a decline in use particularly since most services are now available from the TVNZ website or other websites.

TiVo 
On 26 March 2009 TVNZ announced that it had acquired a 33% stake in Hybrid Television Services (67% owned by Australia's Seven Media Group).  Hybrid TV is the exclusive licensee of TiVo products in Australia and New Zealand.  On the same day it was announced that TiVo would be arriving in New Zealand by Christmas 2009 (Hybrid launched it in Australia in July 2008). The TiVo service was discontinued on 31 October 2017.

Discontinued services 
Between 1995 and 1997, TVNZ operated a network of regional TV stations under the 'Horizon Pacific' name and through a subsidiary called Horizon Pacific Television. Its broadcast content included BBC World and NZ documentary programming. The network consisted of newly formed stations ATV in Auckland, Coast to Coast in Hamilton, Capital Television in Wellington and Southern Television in Dunedin. TVNZ subsequently also purchased CTV, based in Christchurch. CTV continues to broadcast, but is no longer owned by TVNZ.

Horizon Pacific was replaced by a local 'free to air' version of the music video channel MTV, based on MTV's UK service and local programming, although the channel was dropped in 1998. Prior to MTV's demise, TVNZ had bought the channel's competitor, Max TV.

TVNZ also operated a satellite services division organising and downlink facilities and across the globe, but this service was wound down in 2005.

TVNZ operated TVNZ 6 from 2007 to 2011. TVNZ 6 was a digital-only, commercial-free television channel. It was available in 60.3% of New Zealand homes on the Freeview and Sky Television Digital platforms. TVNZ 6 was on air daily from 6 am to midnight.

TVNZ 7 was launched in March 2008 and was a commercial-free news and information channel. It was available via the Freeview and Sky platforms. The New Zealand Government, under Prime Minister John Key and Broadcasting Minister Jonathan Coleman decided to discontinue funding for TVNZ 7. The final broadcast ended at midnight on 30 June 2012. TVNZ 7 was replaced with time shift channel TV One Plus 1 (now TVNZ 1 +1).

TVNZ launched U on 13 March 2011. U was a 24-hour youth orientated channel available via both Freeview and Sky. TVNZ U was launched to fill the gap when TVNZ 6 closed in 2011. TVNZ U specialised in musical tastes, reality, gaming, fashion and informative youth orientated documentaries.

On 29 July 2013, TVNZ announced that the channel would be closed on 31 August 2013 and be replaced by a time shift channel, TV2+1 (now TVNZ 2 +1).

TVNZ Heartland was a pay-TV channel that launched on the Sky Television platform on 1 June 2010. It was TVNZ's first channel available exclusively on a pay-TV platform and featured 100% New Zealand made programming, mostly sourced from the TVNZ archives. The channel closed in May 2015.

TVNZ ceased delivering its Pacific Service in October 2015. The service was taken over by Pacific Cooperation Broadcasting Limited, who expanded the service in February 2016 as Pasifika TV.  The service became a collaboration of all major New Zealand broadcasters, as opposed to just TVNZ.  The transition of the service meant that it was now funded by Ministry of Foreign Affairs and Trade, and the objectives were broadened beyond supplying content, to focus on strengthening partnerships in the Pacific by building capacity and capabilities amongst the respective Pacific free to air broadcasters.

Transmission network

High Definition 
TVNZ has offered HD broadcasts since July/August 2008, when the 2008 Summer Olympics were broadcast in High Definition. The service is offered on the Freeview|HD platform, using DVB-T transmission. Only TV One and TV2 are offered in HD, and the majority of programming is still up-converted from Standard Definition. From 1 July 2009 the HD versions of TV One and TV2 became available to Sky TV subscribers who have the MySky HDi decoders. Content on the HD versions of TV One and 2 are the same as the Standard Definition versions however when watching certain shows that broadcast in High Definition the HD logo is displayed next to the channel logo, this logo is not seen when watching the same show on the Standard Definition versions of TV1 and 2.

TVNZ has adopted 1080i as their HD broadcast format.

Kordia, formerly BCL, TVNZ's transmission partner 
TVNZ's transmission network is operated by Kordia, formerly a subsidiary of TVNZ known as Broadcast Communications Limited until 2006. The company owns and operates the terrestrial transmission network used for broadcast of all major terrestrial television networks in New Zealand, including Discovery New Zealand. and Prime Television – TVNZ's major competitors, along with other voice and data telecommunications services.

Geographic history 
TVNZ's primary television channel TV One is provided as four distinct terrestrial feeds, localising to viewers within and around the Auckland, Waikato, Wellington and Christchurch regions.  Localised satellite feeds were made available in 2010 to channel-locked SD receivers. Localised content currently only consists of targeted regional advertising spots toward the end of a commercial break.  Localised regional news programming was discontinued in the late 1980s and all localised versions for TV2 were discontinued in the early 2000s in favour of only national advertising.

TVNZ's predecessor, NZBC started as distinct stations in Auckland, Wellington, Christchurch and Dunedin. Nationwide networked services were first introduced in July 1969 to broadcast the Apollo 11 landing footage, flown in specially from Australia, from Wellington simultaneously across all stations. However, the network was still incomplete, and in some places, outside broadcast vans were strategically placed to temporarily complete missing links. The network was fully completed in November that year.

The national television network consisted of microwave links linking the major transmitters via intermediate repeaters. In 1985, the microwave network extended from Maungataniwha in Northland to Obelisk in Central Otago via Auckland, Waikato, Taupo, Hawke's Bay (with a spur to Gisborne), Manawatu (with a spur to Taranaki), Wairarapa, Wellington, Marlborough (with a spur to Nelson and the West Coast), Canterbury, Dunedin and Southland. Broadcast relay stations served areas off the microwave network.

TVNZ also used to run telethons up until 1990 at locations around the country, viewers would be shown full coverage of the Telethon nearest their location. Originally when TVNZ began broadcasting TV One and TV2 on Sky Digital at the end of 2001 viewers would see only nationwide or Auckland advertisements when watching these channels through the Sky Digital service. In 2004 this was expanded to show one of three feeds for regional advertising spots targeting Auckland, Wellington or Christchurch with viewers outside of these regions seeing advertisements from the closest region. This was again dropped in March 2007 with a return to only nationwide advertising on TVNZ channels on Sky Digital before being reintroduced through the Freeview SD service. Regional advertising spots are only shown on TV One on both Digital and Analogue platforms however those that receive the HD version of TV One through their HD receiver will only see Auckland advertisements. Standard DVB satellite receivers will scan in all versions to be selected by the viewer.

Wellington-based Avalon Studios, long a nucleus of TV production in New Zealand, was finally put up for sale by TVNZ in 2011, with most of its remaining shows relocating to Auckland, completing a trend of northward drift by the broadcaster. TV production was spread evenly around the country in the 1970s, but according to Wellington-based TV personalities, the drift to Auckland began in 1980 with the formation of TVNZ, and the subsequent relocation of the TV One newsroom and headquarters to Auckland under then Prime Minister Rob Muldoon.

In Christchurch, the original TVNZ studios were located at Gloucester Street in the NZBC owned building used to broadcast 3YA and 3ZB. A 14-storey building was also built on Worcester Street as studios for various TVNZ shows, notable shows to be filmed here included What Now and The Son of a Gunn Show. In 1998 TVNZ closed its Christchurch studios. What Now was moved to the Wellington-based Avalon Studios for a few years but moved back to Christchurch to be filmed at the privately owned Whitebait studios. Prior to the 2011 Christchurch earthquake on 22 February, the Worcester Street building continued to house Christchurch radio stations previously owned by RNZ and now owned by NZME (formerly The Radio Network); stations included Newstalk ZB, Classic Hits 97.7 and 91ZM. The Gloucester Street building remained as Christchurch based newsroom for TVNZ until the building was badly damaged in the quake, and has since been demolished. The Worcester Street building was demolished on 5 August 2012 by implosion.

The Dunedin studios were used to film many iconic shows, such as Play School, University Challenge, Beauty and the Beast, and Spot On. When TVNZ scaled back its Dunedin studios in 1989, they were purchased by Ian Taylor, the founder of Animation Research and Taylormade Media.

DVB-S availability 
TV One, TV2 and the hour delayed versions are available "in the clear" over DVB-S on Optus D1 as standard definition only. A Sky set-top box is not required, any satellite set-top box or tuner will work. However the high definition versions on DVB-S2 are scrambled and require a Sky Television H.264 set-top box such as MySky, which costs the price of a basic subscription plus addition MySky rental fee.

Civil Defence 
TVNZ's functions are subject to lifeline utility requirements under NZ civil defence legislation. In practice, this status as a lifeline utility requires TVNZ to be able to function at least to a reduced level after an emergency, and to provide advice to civil defence authorities when requested.

Details prior to December 2013 digital switchover

Technical notes 
New Zealand uses PAL B (7 MHz channel spacing) on VHF, and PAL G (8 MHz channel spacing) on UHF.
 While Australia also uses PAL B on VHF, the frequency allocations of NZ differ somewhat from Australia.
 Australia uses PAL B (7 MHz channel spacing) for UHF, so most UHF channels are on different frequencies.
 For stereo sound New Zealand uses NICAM on a non-standard offset from the monaural FM audio signal, while Australia uses the standard European offset for A2 Stereo.  With NICAM being a digital signal, it has a higher chance of drop out over distance and from interference than A2 Stereo.
 Because of these differences, some Australian TV sets (when taken to NZ) are only capable of mono sound reproduction, and many VHF channels may not be received (properly) or come in at all.
 TVNZ (for historical and technical reasons) uses the greatest number of VHF frequencies in New Zealand.

NICAM stereo 
New Zealand has a near nationwide implementation of NICAM stereo sound for TV One and TV2. 
NICAM stereo was first made available on TV2 in the Auckland region in 1989, also during the early 1990s Simulated Stereo was available in Wellington on TV2. NICAM stereo was not rolled out to the rest of the country or onto TV One until 1996 and for some regions (such as Southland) NICAM was not available until 2001. Rival network Three has offered NICAM stereo in all available regions since its launch in 1989; this is also the case with Prime TV. Stereo sound is available on all TVNZ channels if accessed through Sky Digital or Freeview.

Competitors 
TVNZ's major competitors in the television market are
 Warner Bros. Discovery's Three, Bravo, Eden and Rush
 Sky's Prime
 Māori Television

New Zealand shows

References

Sources

 Chief outlines 'major problem at TVNZ The New Zealand Herald, 13 December 2005, retrieved 3 January 2006.
 TVNZ Annual Report for 2005 Retrieved 3 January 2006
 TVNZ Charter 2003 Retrieved 4 January 2006
 TVNZ Corporate Brochure 2005 Retrieved 3 January 2006

External links

 

 
Television networks in New Zealand
Television channels and stations established in 1980
New Zealand crown entity companies
New Zealand news websites
Companies based in Auckland
State media
1980 establishments in New Zealand